Anthony da Costa (born 1991 in Bronx, NY) is an American singer-songwriter based in Nashville, TN.  He has been writing and performing original material since he was 13 years old. He names Ryan Adams, Dan Bern, and Bob Dylan as some of his biggest songwriting influences. He attended Columbia University and graduated with a bachelor's degree in ancient Greek and Roman history in 2013. In 2016, Anthony released his latest solo album, "Da Costa," which was self-produced and features Aaron Lee Tasjan, Devon Sproule, and members of Ben Kweller, Eric Johnson and Okkervil River. Anthony is also an in-demand live and session guitarist, having toured with Aoife O'Donovan of Crooked Still, Jimmy LaFave, Joy Williams, the Grammy-award-winning songwriter Sarah Jarosz, and two-time IBMA Guitar Player of the Year Molly Tuttle.

Awards and honors
 Winner of the 2007 Kerrville Folk Festival New Folk
 Winner 2007 Falcon Ridge Folk Festival Emerging Artist Competition.
 2007 Mountain Stage New Song NE Regional Finalist
 Showcased at the Tin Pan South Songwriters Festival in Nashville
 Nominated as Folk Alliance Emerging Artist of the Year.
 Received specific mention in The New York Times by virtue of his sideburns.
 2009 Named one of WFUV's New Artists to Watch

Discography

Albums
 Rearrange (2006)
 Quality Time (2007)
 Typical American Tragedy (2008)
 Not Afraid of Nothing (2009)
 Secret Handshake (2012)
 DaCosta (2016)
 Feet On the Dashboard (2020)
 What Plans? (2021)
 I Should Call My Mother (2022)

EPs
 Already There EP (2005)
 Spring EP (2013)
 Shadow Love EP (2019)

Collaborations
 Bad Nights/Better Days (w/ Abbie Gardner) (2008)
 Neighbors (w/ Adam Levy) (2017)

References

American singer-songwriters
American male singer-songwriters
1991 births
Living people
Date of birth missing (living people)
People from Pleasantville, New York
21st-century American singers
21st-century American male singers